The Brühlbach is a river in Baden-Württemberg, Germany. It flows into the Erms near Bad Urach.

Geography

Sources 
The springs of the Brühlbach are located about 150 m southwest of the Urach waterfall. They are several karst springs, which emerge in a rugged limestone plateau. The water comes from the plateau around Würtingen. There, rainwater seeps through the calcareous rock layers. The carbonated water absorbs lime and collects on the water-impermeable marl layer below. Approximately 28 hours after its infiltration, the water reappears in the Brühlbach springs. The flow varies depending on weather and season from about 70 L/s up to 420 L/s. In exceptionally dry summers the springs can even dry up.

Course 
After its source, the Brühlbach falls down the Urach waterfall. Below it is strengthened by further springs. It flows in a predominantly northern direction through the "Brühl" and - after the "Gütersteinbach" from the "Gütersteiner Wasserfall" - through the "Maisental". Near the Bad Urach gauge on the northwest edge of the city, the Brühlbach flows into the Erms.

See also
List of rivers of Baden-Württemberg

Rivers of Baden-Württemberg
Rivers of Germany